Youssef Benali (born 28 May 1987) is a Tunisian-born Qatari handball player for Al Rayyan and the Qatari national team.

References

1987 births
Living people
Tunisian male handball players
Qatari male handball players
Naturalised citizens of Qatar
Asian Games medalists in handball
Handball players at the 2014 Asian Games
Handball players at the 2018 Asian Games
Qatari people of Tunisian descent
Asian Games gold medalists for Qatar
Medalists at the 2014 Asian Games
Medalists at the 2018 Asian Games